Brittney Elizabeth Irvin (born November 10, 1984) is a Canadian actress. She has also done voiceover work for Ocean Productions. Irvin is best known for playing Katie in Scary Godmother: Halloween Spooktakular and its sequel Scary Godmother: The Revenge of Jimmy. She was first billed as Britt Irvin in a 2001 episode of The Outer Limits, and is still sometimes billed as Brittney Irvin in recent work, such as her voice work as Jade in Bratz, and in two of the three episodes of Aliens in America in which she appeared in 2007. She  also voiced Sunny Flare in My Little Pony: Equestria Girls.

Early life 
Britt Irvin was born Brittney Elizabeth Irvin in Vancouver, British Columbia, Canada, and raised in Surrey, British Columbia. She began dancing ballet and singing in festivals starting around 1990 when she was 6 years old. She worked on two musicals at age 10, Show Boat and A Christmas Carol, did voice work in the television series "Nilus the Sandman", and did work in several television commercials between productions, many of which aired in the United States as well as Canada.

Acting career 
In 1996, Irvin appeared in the films Panic in the Skies! and The Angel of Pennsylvania Avenue. In 1998 she appeared in the TV series Little Men on Canada's CTV network, which lasted two seasons. Between 1998 and 2000 Irvin also played guest roles on Sleepwalkers, Night Man, Stargate SG-1, and The Outer Limits. In 2000 she played Laurel Everett in the TV movie Angels in the Infield which also starred Patrick Warburton and David Alan Grier. Also in 2000, she played the role of Maxine Bronty in Quarantine.

In 2000 Irvin acted in So Weird. In 2002 Irvin played a red-wine-loving kleptomaniac named Amy in the MTV movie Wasted and played a role in The Outer Limits again in 2003, the same year she appeared in National Lampoon's Thanksgiving Family Reunion with Judge Reinhold and Penelope Ann Miller. Also, in 2003, she portrayed the late Dana Plato in the NBC TV movie Diff'rent Strokes: The Unauthorized Biography.

She played the single teenage mother Paige Leckie in the fourth season of Edgemont in 2004, but left the series after just one season in order to fulfill other commitments. Also in 2004 she played "Maggie" in the movie Jack.

Her works have included the 2005 film Reefer Madness which is based on the 2003 musical, (though she only appeared in one scene), the 2005 TV movie Absolute Zero with Jeff Fahey and Erika Eleniak, the 2007 film Hot Rod starring Andy Samberg, and playing the love interest of Kevin Zegers' character in Normal, which was also released in 2007.

She is named in the special thanks credits of Louis Belanger's 2009 film The Timekeeper, which premiered in Canada at the Vancouver International Film Festival and in the United States at the Brooklyn International Film Festival. She had appeared in a scene as a character named Nicole Granger, that was ultimately cut from the film.

Irvin is also an accomplished singer and voice-over artist. Her voice-over credits include TV series: Sabrina The Teenage Witch, Madeline, Bratz and in the English-language version of Inuyasha). She was also the voice of X-23 in the episode "Target X" fourth season of X-Men: Evolution (substituting Andrea Libman, who voiced the character in her original appearance); the character later crossed over to the X-Men comic titles where she once headlined her own limited series and is currently featured in the Avengers Academy title.

She was nominated for a Leo Award in 2008 for her performance in Normal.

Irvin also provided the voice of the character Ursula in the 2007 George of the Jungle cartoon series which aired on the Cartoon Network, making her the first (and currently only) person ever to voice a cartoon character in a series remake, where the character had originally been voiced by June Foray in the original. Foray had originally voiced the character Ursula in the original George of the Jungle series from the 1960s – though the character is significantly different in the 2007 series than in the 1967 series. The series aired for only one season.

Her work in 2008 included the voice of Polly, the love interest of Drake Bell's Harold Kelp in the direct-to-DVD animated sequel, The Nutty Professor; 

She portrayed as well as the character Amy in the TV movie Spectacular!, one of the first times she has ever played an antagonist, which aired on Nickelodeon on February 16, 2009. The series The Assistants, in which she plays the lead role Gillian Hughes, premiered on The N on July 10, 2009.

She appeared in the first three episodes of ABC's remake of the 1980s science fiction miniseries V, which premiered on ABC on November 3, 2009, as well as the first episode of Life UneXpected, which premiered in February 2010 on The CW. 
Irvin portrayed Stargirl in the Smallville episodes "Absolute Justice", "Salvation", "Icarus" and "Prophecy".
Her most recent credit is as Kathy Patton in Freshman Father, a Hallmark Channel movie where she portrays a prom queen turned young mother suffering from severe post-partum depression. In 2010, she plays in Barbie: A Fashion Fairy Tale and Barbie: A Fairy Secret, as the voice of Raquelle.

In 2012, Irvin co-starred in Michael Sucsy's film The Vow, which starred Rachel McAdams and Channing Tatum, and also included her former Little Men and Angels in the Infield co-star Rachel Skarsten in the cast.

In 2015, she voiced Sunny Flare in My Little Pony: Equestria Girls – Friendship Games and 2017 Equestria Girls special, Dance Magic.

Music 
Irvin released a demo music album in 2003. She has been known to give live performances in Vancouver and Los Angeles. Her music has never been mass-released, but some of the tracks have been found at sites like YouTube.

Filmography

Film

Television

Music videos
 FRANKIIE: "Dream Reader" (2019)

References

External links 

1984 births
21st-century Canadian actresses
Actresses from Vancouver
Canadian child actresses
Canadian film actresses
Canadian television actresses
Canadian voice actresses
Living people